1924 was the 31st season of County Championship cricket in England. Yorkshire secured a hat-trick of titles. England, in their first home series since 1921, proved too strong for South Africa and won the Test series 3–0.

Honours
County Championship - Yorkshire
Minor Counties Championship - Berkshire
Wisden Cricketers of the Year - Robert Catterall, Jack MacBryan, Herbie Taylor, Dick Tyldesley, Dodger Whysall

County Championship

Test series

England defeated South Africa 3–0 with two matches drawn. There was a sensational start to the series when the visitors were bowled out in their first innings in the First Test at Edgbaston for 30, in just 12.3 overs, after England had made over 400. Arthur Gilligan, the Sussex and England captain, and his county colleague Maurice Tate, making his Test debut, bowled unchanged, with the former taking 6/7 and the latter 4/12.

Leading batsmen
Andy Sandham topped the averages with 2082 runs with an average of 59.48.

Leading bowlers
George Macaulay topped the averages with 190 wickets with an average of 13.23

References

Annual reviews
 Wisden Cricketers' Almanack 1925

External links
 CricketArchive – season summary
 Cricinfo – season summary

1924 in English cricket
English cricket seasons in the 20th century